Airframer is a trade magazine and directory relating to aerospace design and manufacturing. The first issue of the magazine was released in September 2005. It is published by Stansted News Limited with offices located at Bishop's Stortford, Hertfordshire, United Kingdom.

See also 
 Aircraft Manufacturer
 Air Frame

References

External links
 

Aviation magazines
Business magazines published in the United Kingdom
English-language magazines
Magazines established in 2005
Professional and trade magazines
2005 establishments in the United Kingdom